Maofelis cantonensis is an extinct basal nimravid from Late Eocene-aged Youganwo Formation of Maoming Basin, Guangdong Province, China.

References

Prehistoric mammals of Asia
Nimravidae
Eocene carnivorans
Fossil taxa described in 2016
Paleontology in Guangdong
Prehistoric carnivoran genera